The television series Wax and Wane ran for 30 episodes and was broadcast on TVB Jade in the second line series. The synopsis is according to Singapore's MediaCorp Channel 8's synopsis, with little name alterations.

Episodic synopsis

See also
 List of TVB dramas in 2011
 Wax and Wane
 List of Wax and Wane characters

Lists of Chinese drama television series episodes